The Lawrence Lake erratic is a glacial erratic boulder near Lake Lawrence in Thurston County, Washington. Lake Lawrence itself was formed when the Vashon Glaciation created most of the topography seen in the Puget Sound region. The erratic is one of the southernmost in the Puget Sound region,  near the limit of the Yelm lobe of the Vashon Glacier in the Rainier area.

References

External links

Three Geologic Features in Thurston County more awesome than Mima Mounds

Glacial erratics of Washington (state)
Bodies of water of Thurston County, Washington
Individual rocks